The Beauty of Independence is the first extended play (EP) by American hip hop group G-Unit. It was released for digital download on August 25, 2014 and includes six previously unreleased songs.

Commercial performance
The album debuted at number 17 on the Billboard 200 chart, with first-week sales of 14,472 copies in the United States.

Track listing
Credits adapted from the album's liner notes.

Sample credits
 "I Don't Fuck With You" contains replayed elements from "Juan Tenorio", written by Rodolfo Rodriguez and Mark Gonzales.
 "Digital Scale" contains elements from "Turn Down The Sound", written by Adrian Younge and Loren Oden, performed by Adrian Younge.

Charts

Weekly charts

Year-end charts

References

2014 debut EPs
G-Unit albums
Hip hop EPs
Albums produced by Havoc (musician)
Gangsta rap EPs